Gian Marco Moroni was the defending champion but withdrew from the tournament due to a back injury.

Federico Coria won the title after defeating Francesco Passaro 7–6(7–2), 6–4 in the final.

Seeds

Draw

Finals

Top half

Bottom half

References

External links
Main draw
Qualifying draw

Aspria Tennis Cup - 1
2022 Singles